Greta Fernández Berbel (born 4 February 1995) is a Spanish actress, best known for her roles in Elisa & Marcela and A Thief's Daughter.

Biography 
Greta Fernández Berbel was born in Barcelona on 4 February 1995. She is the daughter of actor Eduard Fernández and writer . When she was 10 years old, she featured in Cesc Gay's film Ficció (also starred by her father).

Filmography

Film

Television

References

External links

1995 births
Living people
Actresses from Barcelona
Spanish film actresses
Spanish television actresses
21st-century Spanish actresses